The works of Maya Angelou encompass autobiography, plays, poetic, and television producer.  She also had an active directing, acting, and speaking career.  She is best known for her books, including her series of seven autobiographies, starting with the critically acclaimed I Know Why the Caged Bird Sings (1969).

Angelou's autobiographies are distinct in style and narration, and "stretch over time and place", from Arkansas to Africa and back to the US.  They take place from the beginnings of World War II to the assassination of Martin Luther King Jr. Angelou wrote collections of essays, including Wouldn't Take Nothing for My Journey Now (1993) and Even the Stars Look Lonesome (1997), which writer Hilton Als called her "wisdom books" and "homilies strung together with autobiographical texts". Angelou used the same editor throughout her writing career, Robert Loomis, an executive editor at Random House, until he retired in 2011. Angelou said regarding Loomis: "We have a relationship that's kind of famous among publishers."

She was one of the most honored writers of her generation, earning an extended list of honors and awards, as well as more than 30 honorary degrees. She was a prolific writer of poetry; her volume Just Give Me a Cool Drink of Water 'fore I Diiie (1971) was nominated for the Pulitzer Prize, and she was chosen by President Bill Clinton to recite her poem "On the Pulse of Morning" during his inauguration in 1993.

Angelou's successful acting career included roles in numerous plays, films, and television programs, such as in the television mini-series Roots in 1977.  Her screenplay Georgia, Georgia (1972) was the first original film script by a black woman to be produced. and she was the first African-American woman to direct a major motion picture, Down in the Delta, in 1998. Since the 1990s, Angelou participated in the lecture circuit, which she continued into her eighties.

Literature 
Unless otherwise stated, the items in this list are from Gillespie et al, pp. 186–191.

Autobiographies
 I Know Why the Caged Bird Sings (1969). New York: Random House. 
 Gather Together in My Name (1974). New York: Random House. 
 Singin' and Swingin' and Gettin' Merry Like Christmas (1976). New York: Random House. 
 The Heart of a Woman (1981). New York: Random House. 
 All God's Children Need Traveling Shoes (1986). New York: Random House. 
 A Song Flung Up to Heaven (2002). New York: Random House. 
 I Know Why the Caged Bird Sings: The Collected Autobiographies of Maya Angelou (2004). New York: Modern Library.     
 Mom & Me & Mom (2013). New York: Random House.

Poetry
 Just Give Me a Cool Drink of Water 'fore I Diiie (1971). New York: Random House. 
 Oh Pray My Wings Are Gonna Fit Me Well (1975). New York: Random House. 
 And Still I Rise (1978). New York: Random House. 
 Shaker, Why Don't You Sing? (1983). New York: Random House. 
 Poems (1986). New York: Random House. 
 Now Sheba Sings the Song (1987). New York: Plume Books. 
 I Shall Not Be Moved (1990). New York: Bantam Books. 
 On the Pulse of Morning (1993). New York: Random House. 
 The Complete Collected Poems of Maya Angelou (1994). New York: Random House. 
 Phenomenal Woman: Four Poems Celebrating Women (1995). New York: Random House. 
 A Brave and Startling Truth (1995). New York: Random House. 
 "From a Black Woman to a Black Man", 1995
 Amazing Peace (2005). New York: Random House. 
 Mother: A Cradle to Hold Me (2006). New York: Random House. 
 "Celebrations, Rituals of Peace and Prayer" (2006). New York: Random House. 
 Poetry for Young People (2007). Berkshire, U.K.: Sterling Books. 
 "We Had Him", 2009
 "His Day is Done", 2013

Personal essays
 Wouldn't Take Nothing for My Journey Now (1993). New York: Random House. 
 Even the Stars Look Lonesome (1997). New York: Random House. 
 Letter to My Daughter (2008). New York: Random House.

Cookbooks
 Hallelujah! The Welcome Table: A Lifetime of Memories with Recipes (2004). New York: Random House. 
 Great Food, All Day Long: Cook Splendidly, Eat Smart (2010). New York: Random House. ≠←

Children's books
 Life Doesn't Frighten Me (1993). New York: Stewart, Tabori & Chang. 
 My Painted House, My Friendly Chicken and Me (1994). New York: Knopf Books. . With photographs by Margaret Courtney-Clarke.
 Kofi and His Magic (1996). New York: Knopf Books. . With photographs by Courtney-Clarke.
 Maya's World series (2004). New York: Random House:
 Izak of Lapland, 
 Angelina of Italy, 
 Renée Marie of France 
 Mikale of Hawaii

Plays
 Cabaret for Freedom (musical revue), with Godfrey Cambridge, 1960
 The Least of These, 1966
 The Best of These (drama), 1966
 Gettin' up Stayed on My Mind, 1967
 Sophocles, Ajax (adaptation), 1974
 And Still I Rise (writer/director), 1976
 Moon on a Rainbow Shawl (director), 1978

Film and television
 Blacks, Blues, Black! (writer, producer and host – ten one-hour programs, National Education Television), 1968
 Georgia, Georgia (writer for script and musical score), Sweden, 1972
 All Day Long (writer/director), 1974
 PBS documentaries (1975):
 Who Cares About Kids & Kindred Spirits (KERA-TV, Dallas, Texas)
 Maya Angelou: Rainbow in the Clouds (WTVS-TV, Detroit, Michigan)
 To the Contrary (Maryland Public Television)
 Tapestry and Circles
 Assignment America (six one-half hour programs), 1975
 Part One: The Legacy; Part Two: The Inheritors (writer and host), 1976
 I Know Why the Caged Bird Sings (writer for script and musical score), 1979
 Sister, Sister (writer), 20th Century Fox Television, 1982
 Brewster Place (writer), ABC, 1990
 Down in the Delta (director), Miramax Films, 1998
 The Black Candle (poetry, narration), Starz, 2012

Plays and films acted in (partial list) 
 Porgy and Bess, 1954–1955
 Calypso, 1957
 The Blacks, 1960
 Mother Courage, 1964
 Look Away, 1973
 Roots, ABC, 1977
 Runaway, Hallmark Hall of Fame Productions, 1993
Poetic Justice, 1993
 Touched by an Angel ("Reunion"), CBS, 1995
 How to Make an American Quilt, Universal Pictures, 1995
 Madea's Family Reunion, Tyler Perry Studios, 2006

Recordings
 Miss Calypso, Scamp Records, 1957
 For the Love of Ivy, ABC Records, 1968
 "And So It Goes" (co-written with Roberta Flack for Flack's album Oasis), 1988
 Been Found (collaborated on 7 tracks with Ashford & Simpson), 1996
 "Music, Deep Rivers in My Soul" (with Wynton Marsalis), 2007

Spoken-word albums
 The Poetry of Maya Angelou, GWP Records, 1969
 Women in Business, 1981
 On the Pulse of Morning, Random House Audio, 1993
 A Song Flung Up to Heaven, Random House Audio, 2002

Radio
 Talk show host, Oprah and Friends, XM Satellite Radio, launched 2006

References

Works cited
 Gillespie, Marcia Ann, Rosa Johnson Butler, and Richard A. Long. (2008). Maya Angelou: A Glorious Celebration. New York: Random House. 

Bibliographies by writer
Maya Angelou